Ambrose Harmer (died c.1647) was a Virginia landowner and politician. An opponent of Governor Sir John Harvey, he served on the Council 1639–41 under his successor, Sir Francis Wyatt. He served in the House of Burgesses 1645–46, and was Speaker in the 1646 session.

Notes

References

1647 deaths
Speakers of the Virginia House of Burgesses
People from James City County, Virginia
Year of birth unknown